Thomas Coumans (born 16 September 1984) is a Belgian actor.

His father Yves was a stage director, and he graduated from the Higher National Institute of Performing Arts (I.N.S.A.S.) in Brussels. After his graduation in 2006, he worked on various projects in Belgium, including La Marea directed by Mariano Pensotti Stories and Petites Histoires de Cœur with Zygomars.

Filmography

References

External links
 
 Thomas Coumans 
 Thomas Coumans 
 Actor Profile

1984 births
Living people
Belgian male actors
21st-century Belgian male actors